Diwan Bahadur Rishiyur Venkata Srinivasa Aiyar  (1852 – 31 March 1909) was an Indian civil servant, legislator and politician from the Madras Presidency.

Early life and education 
Srinivasa Aiyar was born to R. S. Venkatarama Aiyar   and his wife, Valambal, in his maternal grandfather's house at Vaiyacalathore in 1852. He was the eldest of their four children.

Educational career 

On completion of his studies, Srinivasa Aiyar worked as Assistant master at Wesleyan High School, Bangalore for three years and as Assistant Lecturer in Government Arts College, Kumbakonam from 1873 to 1884.

Provincial Civil Service 

In 1884, he joined the Provincial civil service of Madras as an assistant in the Revenue Settlement Department. He rose to become Secretary to the Commissioner of Revenue Settlement and was, in July 1896, appointed as the Director of the Department of Land Records and Agriculture in the Madras Presidency. He became the Inspector General of Registration in December 1903 and was nominated to the Madras Legislative Council in November 1902 and for a second term on  30 October 1903.

Proficiency in mathematics 

Aiyar was renowned for his proficiency in mathematics and was called "Euclid" or "Geometry" Srinivasa Aiyar.

Indian National Congress 

Aiyar was also associated with the Indian National Congress in its early days.

Family 

He was the paternal uncle of R. S. Subbalakshmi, a social reformer and educationist.

Notes

References 

 
 

1852 births
1909 deaths
Companions of the Order of the Indian Empire
People from Tiruvarur district
Dewan Bahadurs